The 2017–18 Notre Dame Fighting Irish men's basketball team represented the University of Notre Dame during the 2017–18 NCAA Division I men's basketball season. The Fighting Irish, led by 18th-year head coach Mike Brey, played their home games at Edmund P. Joyce Center in South Bend, Indiana as fifth-year members of the Atlantic Coast Conference. They finished the season 21–15, 8–10 in ACC play to finish tied with Syracuse for tenth place. As the No. 10 seed in the ACC tournament, they defeated Pittsburgh in the first round and Virginia Tech in the second round before losing to Duke in the quarterfinals. They were one of the last four teams not selected for the NCAA tournament and as a result earned a No. 1 seed in the National Invitation Tournament, where they defeated Hampton in the first round before losing to Penn State in the second round.

Previous season
The Fighting Irish finished the 2016–17 season 26–10, 12–6 in ACC play to finish in a three-way tie for second place. They defeated Virginia and Florida State to advance to the championship game of the ACC tournament where they lost to Duke. They received an at-large bid to the NCAA tournament as the No. 5 seed in the West Region. There they defeated #12 seed Princeton in the First Round before losing in the Second Round where they lost to #4 seed West Virginia.

Offseason

Departures

Incoming transfers

2017 recruiting class

2018 recruiting class

Roster

Schedule and results

|-
!colspan=12 style=|Exhibition

|-
!colspan=12 style=| Non-conference regular season

|-
!colspan=12 style=| ACC regular season

|-
!colspan=12 style=| ACC Tournament

|-
!colspan=12 style=| NIT

Rankings

^Coaches did not release a Week 2 poll.
*AP does not release post-NCAA tournament rankings

References

Notre Dame Fighting Irish men's basketball seasons
Notre Dame
Notre Dame Fighting Irish men's basketball
Notre Dame Fighting Irish men's basketball
Notre Dame